The Omloop Het Nieuwsblad U23 is a cycling race held annually in Flanders, Belgium. It is part of the UCI Europe Tour in category 1.2.

Winners

References

External links

Cycle races in Belgium
UCI Europe Tour races
Recurring sporting events established in 1950
1950 establishments in Belgium
Omloop Het Nieuwsblad